Ion Cristoiu (born November 16, 1948, Găgești, Vrancea County) is a Romanian journalist and a controversial figure in the Romanian public due to his involvement as informant at Securitate. He was editor-in-chief of the daily Evenimentul Zilei during its heyday in the 1990s, when the average daily circulation topped 600,000, making it the most read newspaper in Romania, after “Romania Libera” (1 ml) and one of the most read in Eastern Europe as well.  He also founded or played a major role at a number of the weekly publications during that era: Expres, Expres Magazin, and Zig-Zag. All these publications were highly critical of president Ion Iliescu.

He was the anchor for the TV talk-show "Ultimul cuvant" (The Last Word) (http://www.b1.ro/emisiuni/read/ultimul-cuvant.html) for the Romanian private TV station B1TV.

Collaboration with the Security - code name "Coroiu" 
Corneliu Vadim Tudor in 2008 reported publicly, that Mr. Ion Cristoiu "was more than the caster, he was a source", the senator declares that Ion Cristoiu snitched on him to the Securitate (Communist Romania's secret police) under the code name "Coroiu". Vadim said that this results from a tab of his scurity file at the National Council for the Study of the Securitate Archives.

Mădălin Hodor, a Romanian historian and researcher, gave an interview to Newsweek Romania magazine in 2018, in which he spoke about the fact that the journalist is mentioned, in documents from the archives of the former Securitate, as the "Coroiu" source.

According to The National Council for the Study of the Securitate Archives, Ion Cristoiu appears in the database both in the index of collaborators, in the SIE file (Foreign Intelligence Service Romania) 41448, and in the Index of follow-ups, twice, as a writer, with a conspiratorial name TO “Coroiu”, 1987, and as deputy editor-in-chief of "Scânteia Tineretului", for the attention of SMB (Bucharest City Security), 1983, 1984

The historian Marius Oprea confirmed the authenticity of the list published in Revista 22, but drew attention to the fact that the respective document represented a simple work list of the Securitate, which means that not all those who appear there were actually collaborators.

References 

 

People from Vrancea County
Romanian magazine editors
Romanian magazine founders
Romanian newspaper editors
Romanian newspaper founders
1948 births
Living people